Choo Kyung-ho (Korean: 추경호, born 29 July 1960) is a South Korean government official and politician. He is the Deputy Prime Minister and Minister of Economy and Finance under the Yoon Suk-yeol government. He has been serving as the Member of the National Assembly for Dalseong since 2016.

Before entering to the National Assembly, he served as the 1st Deputy Minister of Economy and Finance, as well as the Minister for Government Policy Coordination under the President Park Geun-hye, and the Vice Chairman of the Financial Services Commission under the Lee Myung-bak government.

Personal life and education 
Choo was born in Dalseong, North Gyeongsang (now under Daegu) and attended Keisung High School. He was educated at Korea University, where he completed Bachelor in Business Administration. He also obtained master's degree in economics at the University of Oregon, United States.

He is married to Kim Hee-kyung and has 2 daughters.

Early career 
From 1987, he had been working at the Economic Planning Board and the Ministry of Finance and Economy; both are the predecessors of the Ministry of Economy and Finance. During this time, he drew the basis of South Korean macroeconomics. He was sent to the World Bank in 1999 and also worked as an councillor at the Organisation for Economic Co-operation and Development (OECD) from 2006 to 2009. He also served as the Vice Chairman of the Financial Services Commission.

Political career 

Following the 2012 presidential election, the President Park Geun-hye appointed him as the 1st Deputy Minister of Economy and Finance in March 2013. He was promoted to the Minister for Government Policy Coordination in July 2014.

Prior to the 2016 election, Choo joined the Saenuri Party, along with Chong Jong-sup, who was also the Cabinet member under the President Park. He contested for Dalseong and was elected. He became the Director of The Yeouido Institute in March 2017, shortly after the impeachment of Park Geun-hye. He was re-elected in 2020.

Following the 2022 presidential election, President-elect Yoon Suk-yeol nominated him as the Deputy Prime Minister and the Minister of Economy and Finance.

Election results

General elections

References

External links 
 Choo Kyung-ho on Facebook

 
1960 births
Living people
People from Daegu
Korea University alumni
University of Oregon alumni
Members of the National Assembly (South Korea)
People Power Party (South Korea) politicians
Deputy Prime Ministers of South Korea
Finance ministers of South Korea